Dr. Robert Pukose Satia is a Kenyan politician. He was elected a member of parliament representing Endebess in the National Assembly on 28 March 2013. He is the first MP for the newly created Endebess constituency in Trans-Nzoia County. The constituency is made up of Sabaot, Nandi, Bukusu, Turkana, and Pokot ethnic groups. He vied on a United Republican Party (URP) ticket and emerged victorious after beating his closest rival Joseph Mtoto. He is a trained surgeon and medical doctor by profession. He worked at Kabarnet District Hospital where he was the superintendent.

References

Living people
United Republican Party (Kenya) politicians
People from Trans-Nzoia County
Year of birth missing (living people)
Members of the 11th Parliament of Kenya
Members of the 12th Parliament of Kenya
Members of the 13th Parliament of Kenya
21st-century Kenyan politicians